Ometepec Nahuatl, also known as Southern Guerrero Nahuatl, is one of the Central Nahuatl languages of south-central Mexico. The dialects of the three areas where Ometepec Nahuatl is spoken are distinct enough to potentially be considered separate languages.

References

Nahuatl